Deelemanikara is a monotypic genus of east African huntsman spiders containing the single species, Deelemanikara christae. It was first described by Peter Jäger in 2021, and it has only been found in Madagascar.

See also
 List of Sparassidae species

References

Monotypic Sparassidae genera
Spiders of Madagascar